John Calvin Klippstein (October 17, 1927 – October 10, 2003) was an American professional baseball pitcher (mostly a reliever), who played in Major League Baseball (MLB) for a number of teams, over an 18-season career. The most prominent portion of his early career was spent with the Chicago Cubs (–). Klippstein’s career stat line included a 101–118 record, with a 4.24 earned run average (ERA), in 711 games (161 of them as a  starter). He had 1,158 strikeouts in  innings pitched. Klippstein was often known for his control problems.

Klippstein became a world champion with the Los Angeles Dodgers, in the 1959 World Series, but played a much more significant role in the Minnesota Twins’ pennant run in 1965. He was the son-in-law of (the late) MLB pitcher Dutch Leonard.

Klippstein died October 10, 2003, while listening to a radio broadcast of the Cubs versus Florida Marlins game of the National League Championship Series.

See also
 List of Major League Baseball annual saves leaders

References

External links

Johnny Klippstein at SABR (Baseball BioProject)
Johnny Klippstein at Baseball Almanac
A Pennant for the Twin Cities: The 1965 Minnesota Twins at SABR (Baseball Games Project)

1927 births
2003 deaths
Chicago Cubs players
Cincinnati Redlegs players
Los Angeles Dodgers players
Cleveland Indians players
Cincinnati Reds players
Philadelphia Phillies players
Minnesota Twins players
Detroit Tigers players
Detroit Tigers scouts
Washington Senators (1961–1971) players
Baseball players from Washington, D.C.
Major League Baseball pitchers
Allentown Cardinals players
Winston-Salem Cardinals players
Lynchburg Cardinals players
Omaha Cardinals players
Columbus Red Birds players
Mobile Bears players
Lima Red Birds players